Codonanthopsis luteola is a species of flowering plant in the family Gesneriaceae. This species is native to Panamá and mainly grows in wet subtropical biomes. Codonanthopsis luteola was first published in 2013.

References

Flora of Panama
Gesnerioideae
Plants described in 2013